Nationality words link to articles with information on the nation's poetry or literature (for instance, Irish or France).

Events
 Formation in Paris of Antoine de Baïf's Académie de Poésie et Musique, and consequent development of musique mesurée by composers such as Claude Le Jeune and Guillaume Costeley
 Torquato Tasso travels to Paris in the service of Cardinal Luigi d'Este.

Works published
 Thomas Churchyard, A Discourse of Rebellion
 Lodovico Castelvetro,  ("The Poetics of Aristotle in the Vulgar Language"), called the most famous Italian Renaissance commentary on Aristotle's Poetics
 Thomas Preston, a broadside ballad; published in London by William Griffith

Births
Death years link to the corresponding "[year] in poetry" article:
 Sir Robert Aytoun (died 1638), Scottish poet
 Eliáš Láni (died 1618), Slovak
 Thomas Bateson, also spelled "Batson" or "Betson", birth year uncertain (died 1630), English writer of madrigals
 Charles Best (died 1627), English poet, writer of "A Sonnet of the Moon"
 Tadhg mac Dáire Mac Bruaideadha (died 1652), Irish Gaelic poet and historian
 Francisco de Medrano born (died 1607), Spanish
 Pedro de Oña (died 1643), first known Chilean poet
 Samuel Rowlands, birth year uncertain (died c. 1630), English pamphleteer, poet and satirist
 François du Souhait, born between 1570 and 1580 (died 1617), French language translator, novelist, poet, satirist, and moral philosopher
 Adrianus Valeriuss, born sometime from this year to 1575 (died 1625), Dutch
 Yuan Zhongdao (died 1624), Chinese poet, essayist, travel diarist and official

Deaths
Birth years link to the corresponding "[year] in poetry" article:
 March 25 – Johann Walter (born 1496), German poet and composer
 November – Jacques Grévin (born c. 1539), French playwright and poet

See also

 Poetry
 16th century in poetry
 16th century in literature
 Dutch Renaissance and Golden Age literature
 Elizabethan literature
 French Renaissance literature
 Renaissance literature
 Spanish Renaissance literature

Notes

16th-century poetry
Poetry